The Coppa Titano is the national football cup of San Marino. It was first awarded in 1937.

Cup Winners
1937 : Libertas
not played from 1938 to 1949
1950 : Libertas
not played from 1951 to 1953
1954 : Libertas
not played from 1955 to 1957
1958 : Libertas
1959 : Libertas
1960 : not played
1961 : Libertas
not played from 1962 to 1964
1965 : Juvenes
1966 : Tre Fiori
1967 : Tre Penne
1968 : Juvenes
1969 : not assigned
1970 : Tre Penne
1971 : Tre Fiori
1972 : Domagnano
1973 : not assigned
1974 : Tre Fiori
1975 : Tre Fiori
1976 : Juvenes
1977 : Dogana
1978 : Juvenes
1979 : Dogana
1980 : Cosmos
1981 : Cosmos
1982 : Tre Penne
1983 : Tre Penne
1984 : Juvenes
1985 : Tre Fiori
1986 : La Fiorita 6-1 Tre Fiori
1987 : Libertas 0-0 (5-3) Tre Penne
1988 : Domagnano 2-1 La Fiorita
1989 : Libertas 2-0 La Fiorita
1990 : Domagnano 2-0 Juvenes
1991 : Libertas 2-0 Faetano
1992 : Domagnano 1-1 (4-2) Tre Fiori
1993 : Faetano 1-0 Libertas
1994 : Faetano 3-1 Folgore
1995 : Cosmos 0-0 (3-1) Faetano
1996 : Domagnano 2-0 Cosmos
1997 : Murata 2-0 Virtus
1998 : Faetano 4-1 Cosmos
1999 : Cosmos 5-1 Domagnano
2000 : Tre Penne 3-1 Folgore
2001 : Domagnano 1-0 Tre Fiori
2002 : Domagnano 6-1 Cailungo
2003 : Domagnano 1-0 Pennarossa
2004 : Pennarossa 3-0 Domagnano
2005 : Pennarossa 4-1 Tre Penne
2006 : Libertas 4-1 Tre Penne
2007 : Murata 2-1 Libertas
2008 : Murata 1-0 Juvenes/Dogana
2009 : Juvenes/Dogana 2-1 Domagnano
2010 : Tre Fiori 2-1 Tre Penne
2011 : Juvenes/Dogana 4-1 Virtus
2012 : La Fiorita 3-2 Pennarossa
2013 : La Fiorita 1-0 San Giovanni
2014 : Libertas 2-0 Faetano
2015 : Folgore/Falciano 5-0 Murata
2016 : La Fiorita 2-0 Pennarossa
2017 : Tre Penne 2–0 La Fiorita
2018 : La Fiorita 3–2 Tre Penne
2019 : Tre Fiori 1–0 Folgore
2020 : not assigned
2021 : La Fiorita 0–0 (10–9) Tre Fiori
2022 : Tre Fiori 3–1 Folgore

Performance by club

External links
San Marino - List of Cup Winners, RSSSF.com

 
San Marino
2
1937 establishments in San Marino
Recurring sporting events established in 1937